The Navy Precision Optical Interferometer (NPOI) is an American astronomical interferometer, with the world's largest baselines, operated by the Naval Observatory Flagstaff Station (NOFS) in collaboration with the Naval Research Laboratory (NRL) and Lowell Observatory. The NPOI primarily produces space imagery and astrometry, the latter a major component required for the safe position and navigation of all manner of vehicles for the DoD. Until November 2011, the facility was known as the Navy Prototype Optical Interferometer (NPOI). Subsequently, the instrument was temporarily renamed the Navy Optical Interferometer, and now permanently, the Kenneth J. Johnston Navy Precision Optical Interferometer (NPOI) – reflecting both the operational maturity of the facility, and paying tribute to its principal driver and retired founder, Kenneth J. Johnston.

The NPOI project was initiated by the United States Naval Observatory (USNO) in 1987.  Lowell joined the project the following year when the USNO decided to build the NPOI at Anderson Mesa.  The first phase of construction was completed in 1994, which allowed the interferometer to see its first fringes, or light combined from multiple sources, that year.  The Navy began regular science operations in 1997.  The NPOI has been continuously upgraded and expanded since then, and has been operational for a decade. The workings of NPOI as a classic interferometer, are described at Scholarpedia, and at the NPOI site.

Description

There are two types of stations that can be used in the NPOI. Imaging stations can be moved to one of nine positions on each arm, and up to six can be used at one time to perform standard observing. Light from either type of station is first directed into the feed system, which consists of long pipes which have been evacuated of all air. They lead to a switchyard of mirrors, where the light is directed into the six Long Delay Lines, which is another set of long pipes that compensate for the different distances to each station. The light is then sent into the Beam Combining Facility, where it enters the Fast Delay Lines. This third set of evacuated pipes contains mechanisms that move mirrors back and forth with a very high degree of accuracy. These compensate for the movement of the mirrors as they track an object across the sky, and for other effects. Finally, the light leaves the pipes inside the BCF and goes to the Beam Combining Table, where the light is combined in a way that allows images to be formed.

Both types of station have three elements: a siderostat, a Wide Angle Star Acquisition (WASA) camera, and a Narrow Angle Tracking (NAT) mirror. The first is a precisely-ground flat mirror  in diameter. The WASA cameras control the aiming of the mirror at the celestial target. The light then hits the mirror of the NAT, which compensates for atmospheric effects and directs the light into the feed system.

In 2009 NOFS began final plans for NPOI to incorporate four  aperture optical-infrared telescopes into the array, which were accepted by the Navy in 2010, and assigned to the Naval Observatory Flagstaff Station.  They were originally intended to be "outrigger" telescopes for the W. M. Keck Observatory in Hawaii, but were never installed and incorporated into Keck's interferometer. Three telescopes are being prepared for near-immediate installation, while the fourth is currently at Mount Stromlo Observatory in Australia and will be incorporated at some point in the future.  The new telescopes will help with faint object imaging and improved absolute astrometry, due to their greater light-gathering abilities than the existing siderostats.

NOFS operates and leads the science for the Navy Precision Optical Interferometer, as noted, in collaboration with Lowell Observatory and the Naval Research Laboratory at Anderson Mesa. NOFS funds all principal operations, and from this contracts Lowell Observatory to maintain the Anderson Mesa facility and make the observations for NOFS to conduct the primary astrometry. The Naval Research Laboratory (NRL) also provides funds to contract Lowell Observatory's and NRL's implementation of additional, long-baseline siderostat stations, facilitating NRL's primary scientific work, synthetic imaging (both celestial and of orbital satellites). When complete by 2013, NPOI will run the longest baseline interferometer in the world. The three institutions – USNO, NRL, and Lowell – each provide an executive to sit on an Operational Advisory Panel (OAP), which collectively guides the science and operations of the interferometer. The OAP commissioned the chief scientist and director of the NPOI to effect the science and operations for the Panel; this manager is a senior member of the NOFS staff and reports to the NOFS Director.

NPOI is an example of the  Michelson Interferometer design, with the principal science managed by NOFS. Lowell Observatory and NRL join in the scientific efforts through their fractions of time to use the interferometer; science time is 85% Navy (NOFS and NRL); and 15% Lowell. NPOI is one of the few major instruments globally which can conduct optical interferometry. See an illustration of its layout, at bottom. NOFS has used NPOI to conduct a wide and diverse series of scientific studies, beyond just the study of absolute astrometric positions of stars,; additional NOFS science at NPOI includes the study of binary stars, Be Stars, Oblate stars, rapidly rotating stars, those with starspots, and the imaging of stellar disks (the first in history) and flare stars. In 2007–2008, NRL with NOFS used NPOI to obtain first-ever closure phase image precursors of satellites orbiting in geostationary orbit.

Installation plans for a 1m Array have been developed by NRL and Lowell Observatory, based on the funded science performed.

Discussion

Optical interferometers are extremely complex, unfilled aperture photon-collecting telescopes in the visual (sometimes the near infrared, too), which produce synthesized images and fringe data "on the fly" (unlike radio interferometers which are privileged to record the data for later synthesis), essentially by taking an inverse Fourier transform of the incoming data. Astrometry is understood by precisely measuring delay line additions while fringing, to match the light path differences from baseline ends. Using essentially trigonometry the angle and position of where the array is 'pointed' can be determined, thus inferring a precise position on the sphere of the sky.

Only a few exist that can be considered operational. To date NPOI has produced the highest resolution optical images of any astronomical instrument, though this may change when the CHARA array and Magdalena Ridge Observatory Interferometer begin optical-band operations. The first astronomical object imaged (resolved) by NPOI was Mizar, and since, a significant amount of astrometry, reference tie frame, rapid rotator star, and Be stellar disk study has been performed. NPOI is capable of determining positions of celestial objects to a few milli-arcsecond, in part due to the optical anchoring of its components using a complex metrology array of lasers that connect main optical elements to each other and to bedrock.

Many specialized lasers are also used to align the long train of optics. The current NPOI siderostat array remains the world's only long-baseline (437-meter) optical interferometer that can simultaneously co-phase six elements. NPOI is expected to grow significantly in capability with the pending addition of four 1.8-meter aperture IR/Optical telescopes into the current array. The enhanced array will also employ adaptive optics techniques. This layout and increased sparse aperture will permit significant improvements to the science capability, from a tenfold increase in measuring ever-fainter wide-angle astrometry targets, to improved positional determination for numerous binary and flare stars. When the 1.8m telescope addition are complete, NPOI also will undertake additional studies of dust and proto-planetary disks, and planetary systems and their formation.

See also
 List of astronomical interferometers at visible and infrared wavelengths
 List of telescope types

References

External links 
 United States Naval Observatory Flagstaff Station
  Additional USNOFS Information
 Lowell Observatory NPOI site

Astrometry
Optical telescopes
Interferometric telescopes
Military installations in Arizona
United States Naval Observatory